Handball event at the 2019 South Asian Games was held at the Pokhara Covered Hall, Pokhara (Nepal) from 4 December to 9 December 2019. In this tournament, 6 teams participated in both the men's and women's competitions.

Medalists

Medal table

Draw

Men

Women

References

External links

2019 South Asian Games
Events at the 2019 South Asian Games
2019 South Asian Games